Anthia pulcherrima is a species of ground beetle in the subfamily Anthiinae. It was described by H. W. Bates in 1888.

References

Anthiinae (beetle)
Beetles described in 1888